Jocelyn is a surname and first name.

Jocelyn may also refer to:

 Jocelyn (1933 film), a French drama film
 Jocelyn (1952 film), a French film
 Jocelyn (opera), a 1888 opera by Benjamin Godard
 Jocelyn (Sicilian chancellor), an Italo-Norman officer serving Roger II of Sicily
 Jocelyn (album), a 1997 album by Jocelyn Enriquez
 Jocelyn, Ontario, a township in the Canadian province of Ontario